Indian School is a BBC documentary series narrated by Nikki Bedi and produced by Colin Cameron. It was first transmitted in the United Kingdom from 16 May 2007.

The series was co-produced with Open University.

Episodes

External links
 
 Indian School at the Open University

BBC television documentaries
2007 British television series debuts
2007 British television series endings